Central Salaya (previously known as CentralPlaza Salaya) is a shopping plaza and department store in Sam Phran District, Nakhon Pathom Province, on the western outskirts of Bangkok, Thailand.

Description 
The mall launched on August 12, 2014. It can be considered as a branch of Central Pattana that supports customers in the western Bangkok metropolitan area.

The mall building is designed in a "Contemporary Botanical" (modern botanical garden) concept. The interior architecture is designed by replicating the patterns of attractions in Nakhon Pathom Province, such as Sanam Chandra Palace, or traditional waterfront pavilion. The external structure is white orchid-shaped wrought iron, symbol of Nakhon Pathom Province.

It has more than 250 stores.

Anchors 
Central Department Store
Tops (Old Tops Superstore)
PowerBuy
B2S
SuperSports
OfficeMate
Food Park
Uniqlo
SF Cinema 7 Cinemas

Transportation 
BMTA bus: route 84ก (Wongwian Yai–Central Salaya), 515 (Victory Monument–Central Salaya)

References

External links 

Shopping malls in Thailand
Central Pattana
Shopping malls established in 2014
2014 establishments in Thailand
Buildings and structures in Nakhon Pathom province